George Gresham (born 1874) was a footballer who played as an inside forward.

Gresham was born in Gainsborough, Lincolnshire and played for Gainsborough Trinity of the Midland League before moving in 1895 to Thames Ironworks, the team that later became West Ham United.

Gresham worked as a ships plater at Thames Ironworks and Shipbuilding Company and played for the works team, having previously played for Trinity in his hometown. In an experimental 'floodlit friendly' on 16 March 1896, Thames Ironworks faced Woolwich Arsenal for the first time. George Gresham scored twice, in a game that Woolwich Arsenal won 5–3.

He was a regular for three seasons for "The Irons", and was part of the team that were London League champions in the 1897–98 season and Southern League Division Two champions the following year.

See also
 1895–96 Thames Ironworks F.C. season
 1896–97 Thames Ironworks F.C. season
 1896–97 Thames Ironworks F.C. season

References

1874 births
Year of death missing
People from Gainsborough, Lincolnshire
English footballers
Association football forwards
Gainsborough Trinity F.C. players
Thames Ironworks F.C. players